The Afghanistan national cricket team visited Zimbabwe in August 2009 to play a first-class designated Inter-Continental Cup match against a Zimbabwe XI. Zimbabwe's participation in the Inter-Continental Cup has been considered a route back to playing Test Cricket. The full national team still participated in One Day Internationals and played a five match ODI series against Bangladesh during the same period.

Inter-Continental Cup Match

References

External links

2009 in Afghan cricket
2009–10 Zimbabwean cricket season
International cricket competitions in 2009
Afghan cricket tours of Zimbabwe